Mykhailo Volodymyrovych Dovbenko (born 31 October 1954) is a Ukrainian economist and politician who served as a People's Deputy of Ukraine in the 8th Ukrainian Verkhovna Rada, representing Ukraine's 84th electoral district.

Education
Graduated from the Faculty of Planned Economy of Ternopil National Economic University, specialty "Agriculture Planning" (1976), post-graduate department of High School of Komsomol at Central Committee (CC). PhD (1989), Doctor of Economic Science (1998), Academician of Academy of Science of High School of Ukraine (2016).

Work activity  
 1976–79 — junior scientist of the science-research sector, a teacher of the Economic Analysis Department of Ternopil Financial-Economic Institute, the main economist of Radcha village collective farm, Tysmenytsia District of Ivano-Frankivsk Oblast
 1979–82 — the 1st secretary of Ivano-Frankivsk Regional Committee of Lenin's Communist Society of Youth of Ukraine (LCSYU) 
 1982–86 – the 1st secretary of Ivano-Frankivsk Oblast Committee of Lenin's Communist Society of Youth of Ukraine (LCSYU) 
 1986–89 – post-graduate student of High Society of Youth School at Central Committee of Lenin's Communist Society of Youth 
 1989–91 – the chairman of the Organizational Party Work of Ivano-Frankivsk Oblast Committee of Communist Party of Ukraine.
 1991–93 – the main economist of currency transactions and foreign exchange transactions of Ivano-Frankivsk Director of JSCB "Ukraine"; Sector chairman, deputy of the chairman of the board"Zahidkoopbank", Ivano-Frankivsk;
 1993–96 – the chairman of the boardof JSCB "Prut I K"; director of the affiliated institution Western Ukrainian Commercial Bank
 January 1997 – 2000 – Director of Vynnytsia affiliated institution of "Pravex-Bank", a Chief Manager of Kyiv JSCB "Ukraine" Board of Bank Directors  
 1999–2014 – a director of the Open Policy Institute;
 Author (co-author) of more than 150 scientific works, in particular, "Economic Encyclopedia"  in III volumes (co-author); a book "Prominent Strangers", "Modern Economic Theory (Economic nobelelogia)" (translated into Russian, Kazakh), "The Crisis of Economy is not the crisis of Science".

Party activity 
 Was a manager of election campaign office of Perto Poroshenko in Ivano-Frankivsk Oblast at presidential elections in 2014.
November 27, 2014 – People's deputy of Ukraine of the VIIIth convocation, party "Petro Poroshenko Bloc" 
 The 1st deputy of the chairman of the Verkhovna Rada of Ukraine Committee on Financial Policy and Banking.
 "Petro Poroshenko Bloc" party bloc, the head of Expert Rada "Petro Poroshenko Bloc" faction in the Verkhovna Rada of Ukraine.

In the 2019 Ukrainian parliamentary election Dovbenko failed as a candidate for European Solidarity in constituency 84 (in Ivano-Frankivsk Oblast) to get reelected to parliament. He lost this election with 12.88% of the vote to Ihor Fris (who won with 22,01% of the votes).

Sports achievements  
 Master of Sports of the USSR in rowing and canoeing (1975)

Awards 
Order of the Badge of Honour (1986).

References

External links
 
 Verkhovna Rada of Ukraine, official web portal

1954 births
Living people
20th-century Ukrainian economists
Eighth convocation members of the Verkhovna Rada
Petro Poroshenko Bloc politicians
21st-century Ukrainian economists